Jean Henri Coleman (29 July 1908 – 21 May 1982) was a member of the British Special Operations Executive during World War II.

Biography
Coleman was born in Neuilly-sur-Seine, France, the son of John Henry Coleman, an English banker, and Eugenie Eulalie Rime, originating from Switzerland. He married Deirdre Brownlow in 1943.

Wartime exploits
After the outbreak of the Second World War, Coleman escaped from France to the United Kingdom.
He enlisted in the Royal Navy in October 1940 as a stoker.
He took part in the Dieppe raid in 1942, and joined the Helford Flotilla until April 1943 when he was promoted to Sub-Lieutenant, RNVR.

He then joined SOE with a codename "Victor". After several unsuccessful attempts, he was parachuted into France on 15 September 1943 and joined the Acolyte network around Lyons. He ran the circuit after Robert Lyon had been arrested in May 1944, until his escape and return in June. He returned to England on 15 September 1944.

In 1945–1946, he was British Naval Liaison Officer in Calais.

He was awarded the MBE, the Médaille de la Résistance and the Croix de Guerre avec Palmes.

Vera Atkins wrote this obituary following Jean Coleman's death :

References

1908 births
1982 deaths
People from Neuilly-sur-Seine
British Special Operations Executive personnel
Members of the Order of the British Empire
Royal Naval Volunteer Reserve personnel of World War II
Recipients of the Croix de Guerre 1939–1945 (France)
Recipients of the Resistance Medal